Events from the year 1734 in Sweden

Incumbents
 Monarch – Frederick I

Events

 The Civil Code of 1734 is passed. This regulates all society, introducing numerous new laws. Among them the ban of torture (though the interpretation of this law allows for the practice to continue), restrictions of a man's right to abuse his wife, bans any other form of marriage except that conducted by the church, and bans illegitimate children from inheritance. 
 Defense treaty between Sweden and Denmark. 
 Carl Linnaeus conduct his trip to Dalarna.
 Brigitta Scherzenfeldt return to Sweden from her enslavement in Central Asia. 
 The amateur theatrical society "Greve De la Gardies comedianter" performs in Stockholm, starring Brita Sophia De la Gardie, which cause an interest for the establishment of a professional Swedish language theater, which is realized in 1737.
 The King's mistress, Hedvig Taube, is officially acknowledged as his lover after she is granted a title and her own residence after the birth of their child, which attracts a national scandal.

Births

 19 February - Nils Philip Gyldenstolpe, Marshal  (died 1810)  
 18 April - Elsa Beata Bunge, botanist (died 1819)  
 20 March - Torbern Bergman, chemist (died 1774)  
 unknown date - Ulrica Arfvidsson, fortune teller (died 1801)  
 unknown date - Catharina Ahlgren, writer (died 1800)  
 Hedvig Sirenia, poet  (died 1795)
 Maria Elisabet Öberg, weaver (died 1808)
 Hedvig Sofia von Rosen, royal governess (died 1809)

Deaths

References

 
Years of the 18th century in Sweden
Sweden